Afrohercostomus is a genus of flies in the family Dolichopodidae. Many of the species were formerly from "Hercostomus Group I" (or the "Hercostomus" straeleni group), one of three groups of Afrotropical Hercostomus species created by Igor Grichanov in 1999.

Species
 Afrohercostomus afer (Rondani, 1873)
 Afrohercostomus argyropus (Loew, 1858)
 Afrohercostomus argyropus argyropus (Loew, 1858)
 Afrohercostomus argyropus par (Parent, 1934)
 Afrohercostomus blagoderovi (Grichanov, 1999)
 Afrohercostomus caprivi (Grichanov, 2004)
 Afrohercostomus congoensis (Curran, 1925)
 Afrohercostomus dimidiatus (Curran, 1939)
 Afrohercostomus eronis (Curran, 1926)
 Afrohercostomus golubtsovi (Grichanov, 1999)
 Afrohercostomus jani (Dyte, 1957)
 Afrohercostomus natalensis Grichanov, 2010
 Afrohercostomus rhodesiensis (Parent, 1939)
 Afrohercostomus straeleni (Vanschuytbroeck, 1951)
 Afrohercostomus stuckenbergi Grichanov, 2010
 Afrohercostomus ultimus (Parent, 1935)

References

Dolichopodidae genera
Dolichopodinae
Diptera of Africa